General elections were held in Paraguay on 9 February 1958. At the time, the Colorado Party was the only legally permitted party. As such, incumbent president Alfredo Stroessner was unopposed for a full term; he had been in office since 1954 by virtue of winning a special election for the remainder of Federico Chávez' second term.

Results

References

Paraguay
1958 in Paraguay
Elections in Paraguay
Single-candidate elections
Presidential elections in Paraguay
Alfredo Stroessner
February 1958 events in South America
Election and referendum articles with incomplete results